"Waterloo Sunset" is a song by British rock band the Kinks. It was released as a single in 1967, and featured on their album Something Else by the Kinks. Composed and produced by Kinks frontman Ray Davies, "Waterloo Sunset" is one of the band's best known and most acclaimed songs, and is ranked number 14 on Rolling Stones 500 Greatest Songs of All Time. It was also their first single that was available in true stereo.

The record reached number 2 on the British charts in mid 1967. It was a top 10 hit in Australia, New Zealand and most of Europe. "Waterloo Sunset" was also released as a single in North America but failed to chart there.

History

Interviewed in May 1967, Ray Davies stated he wrote "Waterloo Sunset" having had "the actual melody line in my head for two or three years". He initially titled the song  "Liverpool Sunset", but scrapped the Liverpool theme after the release of the Beatles' song "Penny Lane". 

The lyrics describe a solitary narrator watching (or imagining) two lovers passing over a bridge, with the observer reflecting on the couple, the Thames, and Waterloo station. Speaking in 2010, Davies commented "I didn't think to make it about Waterloo, initially, but I realised the place was so very significant in my life. I was in St Thomas' Hospital when I was really ill [when he had a tracheotomy aged 13] and the nurses would wheel me out on the balcony to look at the river. It was also about being taken down to the 1951 Festival of Britain. It's about the two characters – and the aspirations of my sisters' generation who grew up during the Second World War. It's about the world I wanted them to have. That, and then walking by the Thames with my first wife and all the dreams that we had." The two lovers in the lyric are named as Terry and Julie. Interviewed in May 1967, Davies stated in 1967 that "if you look at the song as a kind of film, I suppose Terry would be Terence Stamp and Julie would be Julie Christie", referring to the popular British film actors romantically linked at the time. Latterly, Davies has refuted this connection; in 2008, he described the song as "a fantasy about my sister going off with her boyfriend to a new world", referring to Rosy Davies, who emigrated to Australia in 1964. 

The song was the first Kinks recording produced solely by Ray Davies, without longtime producer Shel Talmy; Talmy's contract with the band expired in Spring 1967. Despite its complex arrangement, the sessions for "Waterloo Sunset" lasted ten hours; Dave Davies later commented on the recording: "We spent a lot of time trying to get a different guitar sound, to get a more unique feel for the record. In the end we used a tape-delay echo, but it sounded new because nobody had done it since the 1950s. I remember Steve Marriott of the Small Faces came up and asked me how we'd got that sound. We were almost trendy for a while."

"Act Nice and Gentle" 
The B-side "Act Nice and Gentle" was exclusive to this single and has been described as a plea for "some civility". It has a "country-western influence" that foreshadowed Muswell Hillbillies, and later appeared on album as a bonus track with the 1998 reissue of Something Else by the Kinks.

Legacy and accolades

In the UK, the song is commonly considered to be Davies' most famous work, and it has been "regarded by many as the apogee of the swinging sixties". Highly esteemed for its musical and lyrical qualities, the song is commonly the subject of study in university arts courses. Davies largely dismisses such praise and has even suggested that he would like to go back and alter some of the lyrics; most professionals, however, generally side with the observation of Ken Garner, a lecturer at Caledonian University in Glasgow, who said: "Davies, like all the best singer-songwriters, is intensely self-critical."

Pop music journalist Robert Christgau has called the song "the most beautiful song in the English language". Pete Townshend of the Who has called it "divine" and "a masterpiece". AllMusic senior editor Stephen Thomas Erlewine concurred, citing it as "possibly the most beautiful song of the rock and roll era". In 2004, Rolling Stone magazine placed the song at number 42 on their list of the 500 greatest songs of all time, and was re-ranked at number 14 on the 2021 list. Ray Davies performed "Waterloo Sunset" at the closing ceremony of the London 2012 Olympics. A subsequent reissue of the Kinks' original single entered the UK charts at #47.

Personnel
According to band researcher Doug Hinman:

The Kinks
Ray Davies lead and backing vocals, acoustic guitar, piano
Dave Davies backing vocal, electric guitar
Pete Quaife backing vocal, bass
Mick Avory drums

Additional musician
Rasa Davies backing vocal

Charts

Certifications

References in other works
In her 2000 novel, White Teeth, Zadie Smith references a central character fantasising herself "demanding 'Waterloo Sunset' be played at [her boyfriend's] funeral."
In the 2018 film Love, Simon, the film's protagonist Simon chooses his username (frommywindow1) from lines of the song as he listens to the record.
In the 2018 film Juliet, Naked, singer/songwriter Tucker Crowe plays the song and says he wishes he had written it.
Okkervil River's 2018 album In the Rainbow Rain contains the song "Famous Tracheotomies," which tells the tales of several celebrities' brushes with tracheotomies, and ends with the story of Ray Davies's writing "Waterloo Sunset" (and references the song's melody.)
In the second season of the Netflix show Green Eggs and Ham, the song is heard twice -- in one episode as background music and in another episode with one of the characters, Looka, singing part of it.

Cathy Dennis version

British singer-songwriter Cathy Dennis recorded a version of the song that was released as the second single from her 1997 album, Am I the Kinda Girl?. Her version peaked at number 11 on the UK Singles Chart and number seven in Iceland. Both versions of the CD single feature a cover of another Kinks song: "Sunny Afternoon".

Critical reception
British magazine Music Week rated Dennis' version three out of five. The reviewer wrote, "The approval of Ray Davies — who appears in the video — will help the cause of this cover which captures the atmosphere and laziness of The Kinks' original. This could be the hit to kick off the album Am I The Kinda Girl?." In a 1997 review, the magazine gave it two out of five, adding, "Ray Davies's song is given an unremarkable treatment by the former dance chanteuse, but television exposure should help this reach the Top 40."

Music video
The accompanying music video for "Waterloo Sunset" consists of Dennis singing the song whilst travelling alone in a taxi driven by Ray Davies in a cameo role. The scenes visible outside the taxi windows vary between the London of the 1990s and film of various locations (e.g. driving up Piccadilly with Green Park tube station on the left, Knightsbridge tube station and the small dome north of Finsbury Square) as they were in the 1960s.

Track listings
 UK CD1
 "Waterloo Sunset"
 "Consolation"
 "Sunny Afternoon"
 "I Just Love You"

 UK CD2
 "Waterloo Sunset"
 "Consolation"
 "Sunny Afternoon"
 "West End Pad" (Alternative Supple 7-inch) – 3:41

 UK cassette single
 "Waterloo Sunset"
 "Consolation"

Charts

Weekly charts

Year-end charts

Other versions
Ray Davies performed the song with Damon Albarn, along with a rendition of "Parklife" on Channel 4's show The White Room in 1995.
The Jam released their demo cover of "Waterloo Sunset" on the 2010 deluxe edition of their album Sound Affects
David Bowie recorded a cover of "Waterloo Sunset" for his 2003 album Reality, which appeared as a bonus track. On his cover, biographer Nicholas Pegg calls it "a faithful, affectionate cover of an eternally wonderful song".

Notes

References

Sources

 

 
 

The Kinks songs
1967 singles
Dutch Top 40 number-one singles
Song recordings produced by Shel Talmy
1997 singles
Cathy Dennis songs
Songs about London
Songs about loneliness
Songs written by Ray Davies
Culture associated with the River Thames
Song recordings produced by Ray Davies
Pye Records singles
Psychedelic pop songs
1967 songs
Reprise Records singles
Polydor Records singles
Song recordings produced by Mark Saunders
Pop ballads
1960s ballads